Syed Sultan Mahmoodullah Shah Hussaini (died 1894 CE), also known as "Shah ji", was a renowned Muslim Sufi, saint and scholar of the Quadri, Chisti order from the Indian subcontinent. He was the native of Kurnool . His most famous disciple and spiritual successor was Machiliwale Shah, who in turn became the spiritual master of India's noted Sufi saint.

Biography
Syed Sultan Mahmoodullah Shah Hussaini was a spiritual student (murid or disciple) of the famous sufi Shaikh Syed Burhanuddin Haqqani Haqnuma (whose tomb is situated in Trunk Road, Rayachoti, Kadapa district of Andhra Pradesh). He stayed in Secunderabad and Hyderabad for many years. Many scholars of twin cities learned the intricacies of Tauheed and Tasawwuf from him. He initiated Shah Kamalullah popularly known as Machiliwale Shah in tasawwuf and made him his spiritual successor (Janasheen-e-Silisa).

Death
He died on 6th Zilhajja, 1311 AH corresponding to 1894 CE. His mazar (grave) is situated in Takia Munnamiya, beside Osmania general Hospital, Afzalgunj, Hyderabad.

Urs
His annual Urs is organized by his present successor Moulana Ghousavi Shah (Secretary General:The Conference of World Religions & President: All India Muslim Conference) on 29th Rabi-us-sani every year.

Related
 Machiliwale Shah
 Kareemullah Shah
 Ghousi Shah
 Moulana Sahvi Shah
 Alhaj Moulana Ghousavi Shah

References

1894 deaths
Year of birth missing
Sufi mystics
Indian male poets
Indian Sufis
Sufi poets
20th-century Indian poets
Barelvis
20th-century Indian male writers
Poets from Telangana